
Gmina Sulików is a rural gmina (administrative district) in Zgorzelec County, Lower Silesian Voivodeship, in south-western Poland, on the Czech border.

Neighbouring gminas
Gmina Sulików is bordered by the town of Zawidów and the gminas of Lubań, Platerówka, Siekierczyn and Zgorzelec. It also borders the Czech Republic.

Villages
The gmina contains the villages of Bierna, Jabłoniec, Ksawerów, Łowin, Mała Wieś Dolna, Mała Wieś Górna, Miedziana, Mikułowa, Nowoszyce, Podgórze, Radzimów, Skrzydlice, Stary Zawidów, Studniska Dolne, Studniska Górne, Sulików, Wielichów, Wilka, Wilka-Bory, Wrociszów Dolny and Wrociszów Górny.

References

Sulikow
Zgorzelec County